The University of Toronto is made up of several academic and administrative buildings at each of its three campuses.

St. George Campus

Scarborough Campus

Mississauga Campus

Demolished/Former Buildings

References

University of Toronto campus building guide
ToBuilt - University of Toronto

External links
Clara Cynthia Benson archival papers are held at the University of Toronto Archives and Records Management Services

 
University of Toronto buildings
University of Toronto buildings
Toronto